Warran Medwynter (born 9 October 1991) is a Jamaican cricketer. He played in three List A matches for the Jamaican cricket team in 2001/02.

See also
 List of Jamaican representative cricketers

References

External links
 

1991 births
Living people
Jamaican cricketers
Jamaica cricketers